Armelle Attingré (born 15 January 1989) is a handball player who plays as a goalkeeper for Montenegin club ŽRK Budućnost. Born in Ivory Coast, she represents France internationally.

Individual awards
French Championship Best Goalkeeper: 2013, 2014

References

1989 births
Living people
People from Lacs District
Ivorian emigrants to France
Naturalized citizens of France
French female handball players
French expatriate sportspeople in Turkey
Expatriate sportspeople in Turkey
French sportspeople of Ivorian descent